Greene is a surname. Notable people with the surname include:

Disambiguation lists
Greenes sharing the same first name:
Albert Greene (disambiguation)
Bert Greene (disambiguation)
Daniel Greene (disambiguation)
Frank Greene (disambiguation)
Harry Greene (disambiguation)
Henry Greene (disambiguation)
Herbert Greene (disambiguation)
James Greene (disambiguation)
Joseph Greene (disambiguation)
Joshua Greene (disambiguation)
Kevin Greene (disambiguation)
Mark Greene (disambiguation)
Robert Greene (disambiguation)
William Greene (disambiguation)

Arts
Alastair Greene (born 1971), American blues rock singer, guitarist, and songwriter
Ashley Greene, American actor
Balcomb Greene, American artist
Brenda Shannon Greene, better known as Shannon, American singer
Burton Greene (1937–2021), American free jazz pianist
Charles Greene, American architect, partner in Greene and Greene
Ellen Greene, American singer and actor
Evie Greene (1875–1917), English singer and actor
Frances Nimmo Greene (1867-1937), American educator and author
Frank Greene (singer) (born 1879), baritone brother of Evie Greene
Frank David Greene (born 1963), American trumpet player author, and speaker
Gladys Georgianna Greene, better known as Jean Arthur, American actor
Graham Greene, Canadian actor
Henry Greene, American architect better known as a partner in Greene and Greene
J. Patrick Greene, English archaeologist and museum director
Jack Greene (1930–2013), American musician
Kenny Greene, American singer-songwriter and record producer
Kempton Greene, American actor
Kim Morgan Greene, American actor
Laivan Greene, American actor
Lance Greene, American actor and theater and film producer
Laura Greene (presenter), British television presenter
Leon Greene, English opera singer and film actor
Lizzy Greene, American actress
Lorne Greene (1915–1987), Canadian actor
Maurice Greene (composer), English composer and organist
Patrick Greene (composer), American composer
Patricia Greene, British actor
Peter Greene, American actor
Richard Greene, British actor
Rosaline Greene, American actress
Sarah Greene (actress), Irish actor and singer
Sarah Greene (television presenter), British television presenter
Shecky Greene, American comedian
Susaye Greene, American singer
Talib Kweli Greene, better known as Talib Kweli, American emcee
Ted Greene (1946–2005), American guitarist and music educator
Timothy Greene, South African actor and film director
Vivien Greene, English authority on doll's houses

Military
Colton Greene, Confederate general during the American Civil War
George S. Greene, Union general during the American Civil War
Nathanael Greene, American general (and a name source for many US locations)

Politics, law, and government
Alister Greene, American lawyer and society leader
Alvin Greene, American politician
Aurelia Greene, American politician
Ben Greene, British pacifist
Conyngham Greene (1854–1934), British diplomat, minister to Switzerland, Romania and Denmark and ambassador to Japan
George Greene, 19th-century Iowa Supreme Court justice
Harold H. Greene, U.S. district court justice
James Edward Greene, Liberian politician
Jehmu Greene, American politician
John Greene (settler), English co-founder of Warwick, Rhode Island
John Greene Jr., English colonial Deputy Governor of Rhode Island
Marjorie Taylor Greene, American politician and conspiracy theorist
Moya Greene, Canadian civil servant, President and CEO of Canada Post
Nathan S. Greene, American politician
Thomas Alan "Tom" Greene, Louisiana politician and veterinarian
Walter S. Greene, American politician
Wilfred Greene, 1st Baron Greene, British judge
William Greene (colonial governor), governor of Colony of Rhode Island and Providence Plantations
William Pomeroy Crawford Greene, English politician

Sciences
Benjamin Daniel Greene (1793–1862), American botanist
Brian Greene, American theoretical physicist and string theorist
Charles Ezra Greene, American civil engineer
Charles Wilson Greene, American physiologist and pharmacologist
Cordelia A. Greene (1831-1905), American physician
Edward Lee Greene (1843–1915), American botanist
Kevin Greene, British archaeologist
Margaret Cicely Langton Greene, British speech and language therapist
Victoria Greene, American physicist

Sports
Alan Greene, American diver
Alice Greene, British olympic tennis player
Andy Greene, American ice hockey player
Brandon Greene, American football player
Cathal Óg Greene, Irish Gaelic football player
Charles Greene (athlete), American sprinter
Charlie Greene (baseball), American baseball player
Charlie Greene (soccer), American soccer player
Conner Greene, American baseball player
David Greene, American football player 
Donté Greene, American basketball player
Edward L. Greene, American athlete and coach
Hunter Greene (baseball), American baseball player
Hunter Greene (basketball), American basketball player
Joe Greene, American football player
Kai Greene, American bodybuilder
Keith Greene (1938–2021), British racing driver
Kevin Greene (American football), American football player
Kevin Greene (rugby union), New Zealand rugby union player
Khalil Greene, American baseball player
Marcellus Greene, American football player
Matt Greene, American ice hockey player
Maurice Greene, American sprinter
Orien Greene, American basketball player
Raven Greene, American football player
Riley Greene, American baseball player
Russell Greene, Australian rules footballer
Serginho Greene, Dutch soccer player
Shane Greene, American baseball player 
Toby Greene, American college baseball coach
Todd Greene, American baseball player
Vibert Greene, Barbadian cricketer

Writing and publishing
A. Wilson Greene, American historian and writer
Bette Greene, American writer
Bob Greene, American newspaper columnist
Cheryll Greene (1943–2013), American magazine editor and scholar
Gael Greene, American food critic
Graham Greene (1904–1991), English writer
Hugh Greene, British journalist and television executive
Jamal Greene, American legal scholar and Professor of Law at Columbia Law School
Katharine Greene (1731–1777), American diarist better known as Katharine Greene Amory
Melissa Fay Greene, American writer
Robert Greene (dramatist) (1558–1592), English pamphleteer and dramatist
Robert Greene (American author) (born 1959), American author
Sarah Pratt McLean Greene (1856-1935), American writer
Sonia Greene (1883–1972), Ukrainian-American writer married to H. P. Lovecraft
Tilly Greene, American writer

Other
Anne Greene, known as Mary Gertrude, Irish-born Catholic sister in Australia
Belle da Costa Greene, American librarian to J. P. Morgan, and after his death the first director of the Pierpont Morgan Library
Benjamin Greene (brewer), English businessman
Brendan Greene, Irish video game developer better known as PlayerUnknown
Catharine Littlefield Greene (1755–1814), wife of Nathanael Greene in colonial Rhode Island
Ettie Mae Greene, American supercentenarian
Evarts Boutell Greene, American historian
George Washington Greene, American historian
Mary Greene (nun) (1843–1933), Irish-born Catholic nun active in Canada
Maxine Greene, American educational philosopher, author, social activist, and teacher
Vincent Graves Greene (1893–1988), Canadian philatelist
William Cornell Greene (1852–1911), American copper magnate

Fictional characters
Dominic Greene, villain in the film Quantum of Solace
Hillary Greene, in books by Faith Martin
Mark Greene, in the ER television series
Maggie Greene, Hershel Greene and Beth Greene, in The Walking Dead television series

See also
Greene C. Bronson, American lawyer and politician

English-language surnames